Thomas Lowrie (1 December 1896 – 9 July 1944) was an Australian rules football player at the Fitzroy Football Club and the St Kilda Football Club in the Victorian Football League (VFL). He became a premiership player at Fitroy, playing in the 1916 VFL Grand Final, under the captaincy of Wally Johnson, with George Holden as coach. Lowrie made his debut for Fitzroy against  in Round 12 of the 1915 VFL season, at the Brunswick Street Oval.

References

External links
 
 

1896 births
Fitzroy Football Club players
Fitzroy Football Club Premiership players
St Kilda Football Club players
1944 deaths
Australian rules footballers from Melbourne
One-time VFL/AFL Premiership players
People from South Melbourne